James Richard Charles Hennessy (26 July 1867 – 16 May 1945) was a French naval officer, politician, businessman and equestrian.

Personal life
Hennessy was born on 26 July 1867 in Cherves, a member of the Hennessy cognac family. He married Alice Hennessy, his first cousin, in 1893; they had five children. He died in Paris on 16 May 1945.

Military career
Hennessy attended the École navale, before embarking on a career in the French Navy. Having left the navy in 1893, he was mobilised during World War I. He rose to the rank of corvette captain and was awarded the Croix de guerre.

Business interests
Upon leaving the navy in 1893, Hennessy joined the family business.

Politics
Hennessy began his political career as a general councillor for Segonzac, Charente in 1895. He was elected as a deputy for Charente in 1906, succeeding Gustave d'Ornano, who had died shortly after the general election. He was re-elected in 1910, 1914 and 1919. In 1921, he was elected to the senate, where he sat until his death in 1945.

Hennessy also served as deputy mayor of Cognac until 1929. Several of his relatives, including his brother Jean also had careers in politics.

Equestrian
Hennessy had a keen interest in horses. As a breeder of racehorses, he won the Grand National with Lutteur III in 1909, and the Grand Steeple-Chase de Paris with Lord Loris in 1914.

Hennessy competed in the mail coach event at the 1900 Summer Olympics.

References

External links

1867 births
1945 deaths
Hennessy family
École Navale alumni
French Navy officers
Recipients of the Croix de Guerre 1914–1918 (France)
Members of the 9th Chamber of Deputies of the French Third Republic
Members of the 10th Chamber of Deputies of the French Third Republic
Members of the 11th Chamber of Deputies of the French Third Republic
Members of the 12th Chamber of Deputies of the French Third Republic
French Senators of the Third Republic
Senators of Charente
French racehorse owners and breeders
French male equestrians
Olympic equestrians of France
Equestrians at the 1900 Summer Olympics
Sportspeople from Charente